Kevin Linford Levi Stewart (born 7 September 1993) is a professional footballer who currently plays as a midfielder for Blackpool. 

Born in England, he plays for the Jamaica national team. He has previously played for Tottenham Hotspur, Crewe Alexandra, Liverpool, Cheltenham Town, Burton Albion, Swindon Town and Hull City.

Early life
Stewart was born in Enfield, London and attended Enfield Grammar School. He signed for the Tottenham Hotspur Academy in July 2010.

Club career

Tottenham Hotspur
At the end of March 2013, Stewart went on loan to Crewe Alexandra. On 1 April 2013, he made his Football League debut in the 1–0 win against Preston North End.

Liverpool
On 2 July 2014, Stewart joined Liverpool on a free transfer from Tottenham Hotspur on a two-year deal. Stewart announced the move on Twitter, stating that playing for Liverpool had been his dream since he was a boy.

Loan spells
On 1 January 2015, Stewart, along with two other Liverpool reserve players, signed for Cheltenham Town on a one-month loan deal. He made his Cheltenham debut on 3 January in a League Two match against Oxford United. He marked his debut by scoring in the 2–1 victory for Cheltenham. At the end of the month he was recalled to Liverpool, after picking-up an injury.

On 26 March 2015, Stewart joined Burton Albion on month-long loan. On the final day of the 2014–15 season, Stewart came off the bench in the 64th minute, and scored the winner which handed Burton Albion the League Two title.

On 11 July 2015, Stewart was loaned out to Swindon Town.

On 17 September, Stewart suffered a medial ligament injury in a Football League Trophy victory over Newport County, and was estimated to miss six to nine weeks. In January 2016 he was recalled by Liverpool from his loan.

Return to Liverpool
On 8 January 2016, Stewart was named in the first-team and made his competitive debut for Liverpool, starting the FA Cup third round match against Exeter City, a 2–2 draw. On 20 January, he started again in the FA Cup in the 3–0 home win over Exeter City.

He made his Premier League debut on 14 February in Liverpool's 6–0 win over Aston Villa, replacing Philippe Coutinho in the final 25 minutes. Stewart marked the occasion by being booked shortly afterwards by referee Neil Swarbrick.

On 23 February 2016, Stewart signed a new contract keeping him at the club until 2020.

Hull City 
On 21 July 2017, Stewart signed a three-year deal with Hull City for an undisclosed fee. Stewart made his first start for the club on 19 August 2017 in a 2–1 away defeat to Queens Park Rangers.
He scored his first goal for the club on 21 September 2019 in a 0–3 win away at 
Luton Town.
Following the relegation of the club at the end of the 2019–20 season to the EFL League One, Stewart was released by the club.

Blackpool 
On 23 January 2021, Stewart joined League One side Blackpool on an 18-month contract. He signed a new two-year contract with the club in June 2021."Kevin Stewart Signs New Blackpool Contract" – Blackpool F.C., 30 June 2021

International career
Born in England, Stewart is of Jamaican descent. He was named in the preliminary squad for the Jamaica national team for the 2021 CONCACAF Gold Cup. He made his debut on 30 January 2022, as a substitute in a 3–2 defeat to Panama.

Career statistics

Honours
Blackpool
League One play-offs: 2021

References

External links
Profile at the Blackpool F.C. website

1993 births
Living people
Footballers from the London Borough of Enfield
Jamaican footballers
Jamaica international footballers
English footballers
English people of Jamaican descent
Association football defenders
Tottenham Hotspur F.C. players
Crewe Alexandra F.C. players
Liverpool F.C. players
Cheltenham Town F.C. players
Burton Albion F.C. players
Swindon Town F.C. players
Hull City A.F.C. players
Blackpool F.C. players
English Football League players
Premier League players